Echinodexia is a genus of parasitic flies in the family Tachinidae. There are at least two described species in Echinodexia.

Species
Echinodexia cubensis Malloch, 1932
Echinodexia pseudohystricia (Brauer & von Bergenstamm, 1889)

References

Dexiinae
Diptera of North America
Tachinidae genera
Taxa named by Friedrich Moritz Brauer
Taxa named by Julius von Bergenstamm